Elijah Jeremias Louhenapessy (born 14 October 1976) is a Dutch retired footballer.

Career
An AFC Ajax youth systeam product, he played a single game for the first team before being signed by Italian Serie A club Udinese in 1997, where he was originally supposed to rotate with Johan Walem in the midfield of their 3-4-3 formation. However, he never made a competitive appearance for the club, and at the end of the 2000–01 season, after a loan stint at Salernitana, he was released by Udinese.

After playing for SC Bregenz in Austria, Louhenapessy moved back to Udine to play amateur football in the area.

While playing in the Italian amateur leagues, Louhenapessy was subject to racist abuse from a player. In response, he "charged up and scored a hat-trick, preferring to react with facts rather than words".

He is regarded as one of the worst foreign players in the Serie A despite once captaining the Dutch national under-21 team.

Personal life
Born in Amsterdam, of Moluccan descent, he settled down to Friuli-Venezia Giulia together with his partner from Udine after leaving professional football. After having shortly worked as a youth coach for a number of amateur clubs, he is currently (as of 2022) working as an employee for a company in the aluminium business.

References

External links
 

Dutch footballers
Living people
Association football defenders
Association football midfielders
1976 births
Footballers from Amsterdam
Genoa C.F.C. players
AFC Ajax players
De Graafschap players
U.S. Salernitana 1919 players
SW Bregenz players
Dutch people of Moluccan descent